Elachista melancholica is a moth in the family Elachistidae. It was described by Heinrich Frey in 1859. It is found in Turkey.

References

Moths described in 1859
melancholica
Moths of Asia